Judith (Judy) H. Myers is a Canadian-American ecologist. In 2014 she was elected president of the Canadian Society for Ecology and Evolution. Professor Myers is well known for her decades-long research into plant-animal-microbe interactions, including insect pest outbreaks, viral pathogens of insects, and pioneering work on biological control of insects and plants, particularly invasive species. Throughout her career she has advocated strongly for both the public understanding of science and for increasing the number of women in the STEM subjects: Science, Technology, Engineering, and Mathematics.

Myers was a trustee of the Entomological Society of Canada. In 2004, she was awarded its gold medal for her contributions to the theory and practice of biological control. She also won the McCarthy Award from the Professional Pest Management Association of British Columbia. As a published author, she is widely held in libraries worldwide.

Research 

Myers is known for her work on population cycles spanning more than four decades. She has made important contributions to understanding cycling dynamics through theory, reviews, and data via her long-term monitoring of western tent caterpillars.

Early in her career Myers became one of the pioneers for studying biocontrol. Her research takes an interdisciplinary, collaborative, inclusive approach to the management of environmental pest problems. She emphasizes the importance of long-term ecological data with which to challenge and inform ecological models.

Myers is currently (since 2006) Professor Emerita in the Department of Zoology at the University of British Columbia (UBC). She joined the faculty in 1972 after being a Miller Research Fellow at the University of California, Berkeley (1970-1972). She was cross-appointed to the Faculty of Agricultural Sciences (now Faculty of Land and Food Systems). Myers worked with fellow ecologists Charles Krebs, Tony (Anthony) R.E. Sinclair and her late husband, Jamie (James N.M.) Smith, initially in the Institute of Animal Resource Ecology and later in the Biodiversity Centre at UBC.

Biography

In addition to research, Myers made lasting contributions to teaching at UBC, notably developing the long-running 'Conservation Biology' course.

She is the mother of Iain and Isla Myers-Smith, who were born in Vancouver, British Columbia and Canberra, Australia respectively. Isla Myers-Smith is currently a lecturer at the University of Edinburgh

Myers has served on various NSERC (Natural Sciences and Engineering Research Council of Canada) committees, particularly those related to women in science including the Women's Faculty Award Committee and the Women in Science and Engineering Chair Program. She was a member of the NSERC Biological Control Network and was Theme leader – Greenhouses (2001-2006) and co-theme leader – New, improved microbial agents for management of insect pests (2001-2006).

Advocacy for women in STEM 

Myers was at the forefront of Canadian post-secondary education's efforts to recruit more women in STEM fields during the late 1980s and early 1990s, when she was Associate Dean of Science at the University of British Columbia. At that time simply discussing data related to the leaky pipeline could be contentious. Myers is quoted on p. 298 of Martin Loney's 1998 book critiquing what he described as identity politics in Canadian post-secondary education, The Pursuit of Division: Race, Gender, and Preferential Hiring in Canada. Loney challenged Myers to produce data to support her assertion that policies impeding women being hired were operating during the 1960s. Research into the complex nature of barriers to women being hired in the post-secondary education STEM sector has since expanded significantly. Judy Myers continues to be a strong advocate for women in STEM.

Myers describes some of her own experiences as a woman in STEM (including being the first person to take maternity leave  in the UBC Faculty of Science) in a special issue of the journal Evolutionary Applications.

In addition to her 2014-2016 presidency of the Canadian Society for Ecology and Evolution (CSEE), Myers is past President of the Canadian Coalition for Women in Science, Engineering, Trades and Technology (CCWESTT) and of the Society for Canadian Women in Science and Technology.

Honours
Lifetime Achievement McCarthy Award and Elected Honorary Member, Professional Pest Management Association of B.C. (2009)
Gold Medal, Entomological Society Canada (2004)
Elected Honorary Member of the Entomological Society of Canada (2015)
Cornerstone Award for Contributions to Women in STEM, Chatham University, Pittsburgh PA (2018)

Major publications
Judy Myers and coauthor Dawn R. Bazely's 2003 monograph, "Ecology and Control of Introduced Plants" (Cambridge University Press) was selected as an American Library Association CHOICE Outstanding Academic Title in 2005.
Myers, J.H. and Sarfraz, R.M. 2017. Impacts of insect herbivores on plant populations. Annual Review of Entomology 62, 207–230.
Myers, J.H. and Cory, J.S. 2013. Population cycles in forest Lepidoptera revisited. Annual Review of Ecology, Evolution and Systematics 44: 565-592
Cory, J.S. and J.H. Myers. 2003. The ecology and evolution of insect Baculoviruses. Annual Review of Ecology, Evolution and Systematics 34: 239–272.
Myers, J.H. et al. 2000. Eradication revisited: dealing with exotic species. Annual Review of Ecology, Evolution and Systematics  20: 331–348. This is one of Prof Myers best known publications, having been cited more than 700 times
Myers J.H. 1988 Can a general hypothesis explain population-cycles of forest Lepidoptera. Advances in Ecological Research 18: 179-242
Krebs, C.J. and J.H. Myers. 1974. Population cycles in small mammals. Advances in Ecological Research. Academic Press. pp. 267–399.

References

Canadian entomologists
Canadian ecologists
Academic staff of the University of British Columbia
Canadian science writers
Living people
Women entomologists
Women ecologists
Scientists from Vancouver
Writers from Vancouver
20th-century Canadian scientists
20th-century Canadian women scientists
21st-century Canadian scientists
21st-century Canadian women scientists
Women science writers
20th-century Canadian non-fiction writers
20th-century Canadian women writers
21st-century Canadian non-fiction writers
21st-century Canadian women writers
Canadian women non-fiction writers
Indiana University alumni
Tufts University School of Arts and Sciences alumni
Chatham University alumni
Academics of the University of Edinburgh
Year of birth missing (living people)